Aspies For Freedom (AFF) is a solidarity and campaigning group that aimed at raising public awareness of the autism rights movement. The aim of Aspies For Freedom is to educate the public that the autism spectrum is not always a disability, and that there are advantages as well as disadvantages. For this purpose, the group organizes an annual Autistic Pride Day. AFF provides support for the autistic community and protests attempts to cure autism.

Established in 2004 by Amy and Gwen Nelson, AFF has received coverage from publications such as New Scientist magazine. As of August 2007, The Guardian estimated the group's membership at 20,000. Rob Crossan, writing for the BBC, mentioned their belief that higher functioning autistics are often in possession of extraordinary talents in the fields of mathematics, memory, music or arts.

Current activities
AFF provides a chatroom which provides support for autistics and their carers such as family members. AFF also helps organise and encourage meetups within the autistic community.

Activism
Gwen Nelson, the founder of Aspies For Freedom, has made internet parodies of Autism Speaks, saying that they were silencing opposing views. Aspies For Freedom petitioned the United Nations in 2004 to have members of the autistic community recognised as a minority status group.  A statement was released from the group titled 'Declaration of the autism community'. This article detailed reasons for seeking such official recognition from the United Nations and the work towards achieving this. AFF was cited by The Guardian as a resource for autism employment assistance. Gwen Nelson and Aspies For Freedom have spoken out against prenatal genetic testing for autism spectrum disorders, portraying autism as a difference as opposed to a disease.

See also
Anti-Psychiatry
Autism friendly
Controversies in autism
Neurodiversity
List of autism-related topics

References

External links
 Official website
 Aspies for freedom support chatroom

Autism rights movement
Autism-related organisations in the United Kingdom
Organizations established in 2004
Disability rights organizations
Disability organisations based in the United Kingdom
2004 establishments in the United Kingdom